Baldragon railway station served the village of Baldragon in the Scottish county of Angus. Services were provided by the Dundee and Newtyle Railway.

History
Opened by the Dundee and Newtyle Railway and absorbed into the Caledonian Railway, it became part of the London, Midland and Scottish Railway during the Grouping of 1923. Passing on to the Scottish Region of British Railways on nationalisation in 1948, it was then closed by the British Transport Commission.

References

Notes

Sources 
 
 
 
 Station on navigable O. S. map Near Kirktown of Strathmartine

External links
 RAILSCOT on Dundee and Newtyle Railway

Disused railway stations in Angus, Scotland
Railway stations in Great Britain opened in 1831
Railway stations in Great Britain closed in 1917
Railway stations in Great Britain opened in 1919
Railway stations in Great Britain closed in 1955
1831 establishments in Scotland
1955 disestablishments in Scotland
Former Caledonian Railway stations